Girls Like Me is the fifteenth studio album by American country music singer Tanya Tucker, released on March 3, 1986 by Capitol Records. It included the number one country hit "Just Another Love". "I'll Come Back as Another Woman" and "One Love at a Time" would do almost as well at No. 2 and No. 3, respectively. Rounding out the Top 10 hits was the No. 8 "It's Only Over for You". The album peaked at No. 20 on the Country Albums chart.

Track listing

Charts

Weekly charts

Year-end charts

References

External links

1986 albums
Tanya Tucker albums
Capitol Records albums
Albums produced by Jerry Crutchfield